United Nations Security Council Resolution 1601, adopted unanimously on 31 May 2005, after recalling resolutions 1529 (2004), 1542 (2004) and 1576 (2004) on the situation in Haiti, the Council extended the mandate of the United Nations Stabilisation Mission in Haiti (MINUSTAH) until 24 June 2005.

The Council determined the situation in the country to be a threat to international peace and security in the region. Acting under Chapter VII of the United Nations Charter, the Council extended the mandate of MINUSTAH, to be renewed for further periods.  It also welcomed a report by the Secretary-General Kofi Annan which stated that the peacekeeping operation had made progress towards an environment suitable for political transition, though challenges remained.

See also
 2004 Haitian coup d'état
 List of United Nations Security Council Resolutions 1601 to 1700 (2005–2006)

References

External links
 
Text of the Resolution at undocs.org

 1601
 1601
2005 in Haiti
May 2005 events